
Daglish, Dalglish, Dalgleish or Dalgliesh is a name originating from Gaelic dail (field) + glaise (brook). It may refer to:

People
 Dalglish (footballer) (born 1991), Malaysian footballer
 Alice Dalgliesh (1893–1979), American children's author
 Andrew Dalgleish (diplomat) (born 1975), British diplomat
 Andrew Dalgleish (spy) (1853–1888)
 Angus Dalgleish (born 1950), British researcher
 Ben Daglish (1966–2018), British composer and musician
 Chris Douglas (born 1974), Scottish musician who uses the pseudonym Dalglish
 David Dalgleish (born 1962), Australian politician
 Dick Dalgleish (1880–1955), New Zealand cricketer
 Edward R. Dalglish, Biblical scholar and professor
 Eric Fitch Daglish (1892–1966), British artist and author
 Grant Dalgliesh (born 1975), American game designer
 Henry Daglish (1866–1920), sixth Premier of Western Australia
 Kelly Dalglish (born 1975), British television presenter
 Kenny Dalglish (born 1951), Scottish football player and manager
 Malcolm Dalglish (born 1952), American composer
 Murray Dalglish (born 1968), Scottish musician
 Nicol Dalgleish, Church of Scotland representative in 1591
 Paul Dalglish (born 1977), Scottish football player, son of Kenny
  (1844–1922), British industrialist and engineer
 Robert Dalglish (1808–1880), Member of the British Parliament
 Tom Dalgliesh (born 1945), owner of Columbia Games boardgame maker
 Walter Scott Dalgleish (1834–1897), British author
 Wayne Dalglish (born 1990), American actor; see List of The O.C. characters

Places
 Daglish, Western Australia, a suburb of Perth, Western Australia
 Daglish railway station, Perth, Western Australia

Other uses
 Adam Dalgliesh, a character in novels by P. D. James
 Dalgliesh (TV series), a British television series featuring the character
 Daglish Ministry, the 7th Ministry of the Government of Western Australia
 Dalgleish Report, a study on racial segregation
 Dalgliesh-Gullane, a British built car

Anglicised Scottish Gaelic-language surnames
Scottish surnames
Surnames of British Isles origin